Madison County Airport may refer to:

 Madison County Airport (Ohio) in Madison County, Ohio, United States (FAA: UYF)
 Madison County Executive Airport in Madison County, Alabama, United States (FAA: MDQ)
 Central Kentucky Regional Airport in Madison County, Kentucky, United States (FAA: I39)
 Rexburg-Madison County Airport in Madison County, Idaho, United States (FAA: RXE)
 Winterset-Madison County Airport in Madison County, Iowa, United States (FAA: 3Y3)

See also
 Madison Airport (disambiguation)
 Madison Municipal Airport (disambiguation)